The 2014 BRD Brașov Challenger was a professional tennis tournament played on clay courts. It was the 19th edition of the tournament which was part of the 2014 ATP Challenger Tour. It took place in Brașov, Romania between 1 and 7 September 2014.

Singles main-draw entrants

Seeds

 1 Rankings are as of August 25, 2014.

Other entrants
The following players received wildcards into the singles main draw:
  Patrick Ciorcilă 
  Victor Vlad Cornea
  Dragoș Dima
  Petru-Alexandru Luncanu

The following player entered into the singles main draw as alternate:
  Lucas Pouille

The following players received entry from the qualifying draw:
  Miki Janković 
  Ricardo Rodríguez 
  Guillaume Rufin
  Giulio Torroni

Champions

Singles

 Andreas Haider-Maurer def.  Guillaume Rufin 6–3, 6–2

Doubles

 Daniele Giorgini /  Adrian Ungur def.  Aslan Karatsev /  Valery Rudnev 4–6, 7–6(7–4), [10–1]

External links

BRD Brasov Challenger
BRD Brașov Challenger
2014 in Romanian tennis
September 2014 sports events in Romania